360 Central Park West is a 16-story apartment high-rise on the Upper West Side of Manhattan, New York City. It was designed by Rosario Candela. It is listed as a contributing property to the Central Park West Historic District.

History
In 1930 Prudence-Bonds Corporation issued a 1.4 million in Prudence Certificates covering the first mortgage by the Second Presbyterian Church and Vinross Realities Inc. The church was demolished in 1928 to make way for the apartment building, which includes the congregation's present church.

References

Central Park West Historic District
Residential buildings completed in 1928
Former Presbyterian churches in New York City
Rosario Candela buildings
Residential buildings on the National Register of Historic Places in Manhattan
Historic district contributing properties in Manhattan
Upper West Side
Residential buildings in Manhattan